The Little Wing Autogyro is a series of conventional one and two place autogyros with a tractor engine layout using modern engines and produced by Little Wing Autogyros, Inc. of Mayflower, Arkansas.

Development
Ron Herron was concerned about the problem of pushover fatalities in pusher gyrocopters. He set to develop a tractor layout gyrocopter that also met the FAA rules for ultralight aircraft. A Prototype LW-1 powered by a Continental O-200 engine was soon followed on by the LW-2. The design was influenced by Juan de la Cierva's autogyros.

Operational history
Andy Keech set 29 world records in an LW-5 Autogyro.

Variants
LW-1
Original proof of concept prototype
LW-2
LW-3
A  covered version
LW-4
 A two place long frame version
LW-5
A two place short frame version
Roto-Pup
Ultralight version based on the Preceptor Ultra Pup airframe.

Aircraft on display
 Little Wing LW-5, EAA Airventure Museum in Oshkosh, Wisconsin.

Specifications (LW-2)

See also

References

External links
 

Little Wing aircraft
Single-engined tractor autogyros
Homebuilt aircraft